The Principle of genetics is a genetics textbook authored by D. Peter Snustad & Michael J. Simmons, an emeritus professor of biology, published by John Wiley & Sons, Inc..
The 6th edition of the book was published on 2012.

Description
The book is sectioned into four parts. The first part, Genetics and the Scientific Method briefly review the History of genetics and the various methods used in genetic study. The second part focus on Mendelian inheritance, the third part deals with Molecular genetics and the last section deals with Quantitative genetics and Evolutionary Genetics.

Review
The book had been reviewed and rated high by several editors and geneticists.

References

Genetics books